Coenosia agromyzina is a species of fly in the family Muscidae.

Distribution
This common species can be found in the  Palearctic realm .

Description
The thorax and abdomen show a brownish-black coloration. The antennae are black and rather elongated. Also palps are black. The legs are black. The wings are slightly brown-gray tinted. The main vein running along the leading edge of the wings ends at the cubital vein.

Biology
Adults fly from May to October preying on small chironomids, honeydew and Hedera flowers. Larvae of these flies can be found in March feeding on tiny earthworms (Oligochaeta).

References

External links
 Biodiversidad Virtual
 Galerie-insecte

Muscidae
Insects described in 1825
Brachyceran flies of Europe